René Wilfrid-Émilien Landry (April 30, 1876 – August 22, 1949) was a Canadian political figure in Nova Scotia, representing Yarmouth County in the Nova Scotia House of Assembly from 1928 to 1933 as a Liberal member. He was the first Acadian to practice law in Nova Scotia.

Early life and education
Born in Ste. Anne du Ruisseau, Nova Scotia, he was the son of Dr. Alexandre Pierre Landry and Genevieve Bourque. His father was the first Acadian to receive a medical degree, graduating from Harvard University in 1870. Landry graduated from Dalhousie Law School and was called to the bar in 1910.

Career
Landry was appointed to King's Counsel in 1921.

Death
Landry died on August 22, 1949 at home in Yarmouth after a lengthy illness.

References 

Nova Scotia Liberal Party MLAs
1876 births
1949 deaths
Acadian people
People from Yarmouth County